New Friendship is a 1963 Spanish drama film directed by Ramón Comas. It was entered into the 3rd Moscow International Film Festival.

Cast
 José Luis Albar as Leopoldo
 María Andersen as Isabel
 Elena Balduque as Jovita
 Ángela Bravo as Julia
 Mer Casas as Neca
 Charo (as Charo Baeza)

References

External links
 

1963 films
1963 drama films
Spanish drama films
1960s Spanish-language films
Spanish black-and-white films
1960s Spanish films